This is a list of all present sovereign states in Europe and their predecessors, according to the concept of succession of states. The political borders of Europe are difficult to define. The geographical borders between Europe and Asia are generally agreed to be the Caucasus Mountains, the Ural Mountains, the Bosphorus and the Dardanelles.

See also
List of European sovereign states and dependent territories
Succession of states
Timeline of European nations

References

Europe-related lists
Former countries in Europe
History of Europe
Lists of former countries